Frank Rogall (born 13 September 1961) is a German lightweight rower. He won a gold medal at the 1985 World Rowing Championships in Hazewinkel with the lightweight men's four.

References

1961 births
Living people
German male rowers
World Rowing Championships medalists for West Germany